Jhoti chita (Odia: ଝୋଟି ଚିତା jhoṭi citā) is a traditional Odia white art mostly shown in rural areas of Odisha. It is made from rice paste and with a piece of cloth surrounded with a stick is used to create beautiful patterns. People also use their bare fingers to make jhoti chita. They can be created over walls and on floors.

Jhoti chitas are created for various festivals like marriage, Manabasa Gurubara and Raja.

The traditional of jhoti chita has been utilized used to make saree prints.

References

External links

Arts of Odisha
Odia culture